Mu'an (Japanese Mokuan Shōtō) (1611–1684) was a Chinese Chan monk who followed his master Yinyuan Longqi to Japan in 1654.

History 
Together they founded the Ōbaku Zen school and Mampuku-ji, the school's head temple at Uji in 1661.  In 1664, Muyan succeeded his master as chief of the temple and in 1671 established another temple called Zuishō-ji at Shirokane, Edo. He is honored as one of the Ōbaku no Sanpitsu.

His work is kept in a variety of museums, including the Smart Museum of Art, University of Michigan Museum of Art, the Indianapolis Museum of Art, the Museum of Fine Arts, Boston, and the British Museum.

See also
Egoku Dōmyō
Japanese Buddhism
Obaku no Sanpitsu

References

Ming dynasty Buddhist monks
Qing dynasty Buddhist monks
Obaku Buddhists
1611 births
1684 deaths
Chinese Zen Buddhists
Place of birth missing
Place of birth unknown
Date of death unknown
Place of death unknown
Date of birth unknown
Ming dynasty calligraphers
Qing dynasty calligraphers
People from Jinjiang, Fujian
Artists from Fujian
17th-century Chinese people
17th-century Chinese calligraphers
17th-century Japanese calligraphers
Edo period Buddhist clergy
Zenga